The Thomas Night Hawks are the athletic teams that represent Thomas University, located in Thomasville, Georgia, in intercollegiate sports as a member of the National Association of Intercollegiate Athletics (NAIA), primarily competing in the Sun Conference (formerly known as the Florida Sun Conference (FSC) until after the 2007–08 school year) since the 2012–13 academic year.

In the 2013–14 season, basketball returned to Thomas after a 13-year hiatus. In the inaugural game, the Nighthawks men were victorious over visiting Florida National University by a score of 82–71.  In 2014, the school added a competitive dance team. In 2022, football was added.

On July 1, 2022, Thomas announced that they will left the Sun Conference and they will join the Southern States Athletic Conference (SSAC), starting in the 2023–24 academic year.

Varsity teams
Thomas competes in 15 intercollegiate varsity sports: Men's sports include baseball, basketball, cross country, football, soccer, swimming and track & field, while women's sports include basketball, cross country, flag football, golf, soccer, softball, swimming and track & field.

Achievements
In 2004, the Softball team won the NAIA national championship. 
The Men's Soccer team have won the Sun Conference Tournament in 2013 and 2014, as well as The Sun Conference Regular Season championship in 2018.

References

External links
 

College sports teams in the United States by team
Athletics
Sun Conference teams
National Association of Intercollegiate Athletics teams
College sports teams in Georgia (U.S. state)